Rabas is a village in the municipality of Valjevo, Serbia. According to the 2002 census, the village has a population of 150 people.

Economy
Pravi Pucati Controversial internet gaming company Pravi Pucati has its headquarters in rural Rabas, where online players fire real weapons controlled over the internet.

References

Populated places in Kolubara District